Jeremías Azaña (born 28 July 2000 in Córdoba) is an Argentinian professional squash player. As of November 2022, he was ranked number 138 in the world.

References

2000 births
Living people
Argentine male squash players
Competitors at the 2022 World Games